The Chongshan Street Mosque is a mosque in Xiangshan District, Guilin, Guangxi, China. It is the largest mosque in Guilin.

History
The mosque was originally constructed during the Yongzheng Emperor of the Qing dynasty in 1735. The mosque underwent expansion in 1849 and renovated twice during the Daoguang Emperor and the Republic of China.

Architecture
The mosque spans over an area of 2,000 m2. It was constructed with the mix of Chinese and Islamic architecture. The mosque consists of the main prayer hall, lecture hall, ablution room etc. There are 24 pillars surround the main prayer hall.

See also
 Islam in China
 List of mosques in China

References

1735 establishments in China
Buildings and structures in Guilin
Mosques completed in 1735
Mosques in China